Roger T. Hane (January 3, 1939 – June 17, 1974) was an illustrator of paperback books, commercial advertising campaigns, and record albums, known for his surreal, fanciful art. During his eleven-year professional career, Hane produced over three hundred illustrations. He painted the covers of the Collier-Macmillan editions of C.S. Lewis's Chronicles of Narnia books, as well as such Simon & Schuster publications as Carlos Castaneda's The Teachings of Don Juan and A Separate Reality. He also created artwork for Avon Books, E.P. Dutton Company, and Collier Books.

Biography
Hane was born in Bradford, Pennsylvania and grew up in Bradford's Third Ward. He graduated from Bradford High School in 1956. He studied at the Maryland Institute of Art, and graduated from the Philadelphia Museum School of Art (now The University of the Arts) with a degree in advertising design in 1961.

In 1963, Hane was hired to do a full-page illustration for Esquire magazine; he moved to New York in 1965. He married Elaine Miller in 1964. Among his many magazine clients were Ladies Home Journal, Life, Esquire, Sports Illustrated, Fortune, New York magazine, Redbook, The Lamp, Look, Vista, the Saturday Review, Travel and Leisure, Look, Sylvania, Ramparts, the National Lampoon, and Playboy.

Hane also contributed work to such advertising clients as Formica, Sylvania Bulbs, De Beers Diamonds, BMI, Merck Sharp & Dohme, Inc.; and he designed a number of record album covers for RCA, Columbia Records, and Philadelphia International Records.

Hane died in New York City at age 36 as a result of a robbery and beating in Central Park.

Mr. Hane was posthumously awarded the New York Artist Guild’s Artist of the Year Award in 1974, and his work was featured in the Society of Illustrators’ 1977 publication. The Philadelphia College of Art gives an annual Roger T. Hane Memorial Award to the student with the year's top illustration portfolio.

Selected bibliography

Book covers and inside illustrations

 The Morality of Poetry, by John Ciardi. (Illustrated paper covered boards. 9 leaves. No place: no date.)
 The Bible Smugglers, by Louise A. Vernon (Herald Press, 1967)
 Mohawk, The Life of Joseph Brant, by John Jakes (Crowell-Collier, 1969)

Book covers only
 Flandry of Terra, by Poul Anderson, (Chilton, 1965)
 World In The Making series (Crowell-Collier, 1965–68)
 Marconi, Father of the Radio, by David Gunston, 1965
 Cobra in the Sky: The Supersonic Transport, by Edward A. Herron, 1968
 The Search for Atlantis, by Henry Chapin, 1968
 Ensign Flandry, Poul Anderson (Chilton, 1966)
 The Viaduct, by Roy Brown (Macmillan, 1967)
 The Tripods, by John Christopher (Collier, 1967–68)
 The White Mountains, 1967
 The City of Lead and Gold, 1967
 The Pool of Fire, 1968
 The Man Who Founded Georgia: The Story Of James Edward Oglethorpe, by J. Gordon Vaeth (Crowell-Collier, 1968)
 The Varieties of Man: An Introduction to Human Races, by Edward Babun (Crowell-Collier Press, 1969)
 Sudden Iron, by John Clarke (McGraw-Hill 1969)
 The Rock Revolution: What's Happening in Today's Music, by Arnold Shaw (Crowell-Collier Press, 1969)
 Avon Classic Crime Collection (1969–1971)
 Dead Cert, by Dick Francis, 1969
 It Walks by Night, by John Dickson Carr, 1970
 Beat Not the Bones, by Charlotte Jay, 1970
 Maigret in Vichy, by Georges Simenon, 1971

 The Chronicles of Narnia, by C. S. Lewis (Collier-Macmillan, 1970)
 The Lion, The Witch and the Wardrobe
 Prince Caspian
 The Voyage of the Dawn Treader
 The Silver Chair
 The Horse and His Boy
 The Magician's Nephew
 The Last Battle
 One of Fred’s Girls, by Elisabeth Hamilton Friermood (Doubleday, 1970)
 Under the Moons of Mars, edited by Sam Moskowitz (Holt Rinehart Wilson, 1970)
 Sagittarius, by Ray Russell (Playboy Science Fiction/Fantasy, 1970)
 Addie Pray, by Joe David Brown (Simon & Schuster, 1971). [Later retitled Paper Moon to tie in with the film adaptation.]
 A Separate Reality: Further Conversations With Don Juan, by Carlos Castaneda (Simon & Schuster, 1971)
 The Death of the Great Spirit, An Elegy for the American Indian, by Earl Shorris (Simon & Schuster, 1971)
 The Fiend, by various authors (Playboy Science Fiction, 1971)
 Journey to Ixtlan, by Carlos Castaneda (Simon & Schuster, 1972)
 The Guardians, by John Christopher (Collier, 1972)
 Beyond Apollo, by Barry N. Malzberg (Random House, 1972)
 The Teachings of Don Juan: a Yaqui Way of Knowledge, by Carlos Castaneda (Simon & Schuster, 1973)
 The Seduction of the Spirit: The Use and Misuse of People's Religion, by Harvey Cox (Simon and Schuster, 1973)
 Narrow Exit, by Paul Henissart (Simon & Schuster, 1973)
 Blood Sport: A Journey Up the Hassayampa, by Robert F. Jones (Simon & Schuster, 1974)

Album covers
 Annie Get Your Gun studio album with Doris Day and Robert Goulet
 Joshua Rifkin, The Baroque Beatles Book (Elektra/Nonesuch, 1965)
 Bach, Brandenburg Concertos, by Ristenpart
 Joseph Haydn, Die Jahreszeiten
 Handel, Judas Maccabaeus
 Billy Paul, Going East
 Billy Paul, War of the Gods
 B. C. & M. Choir, Hello Sunshine
 Cream, "Good Bye"
 Glenn Gould - Bach: Well-Tempered Clavier Book 2, Vol.3 17-24 Columbia

Notes

References
 Walter Reed and Roger Reed, The Illustrator in America, 1880-1980: A Century of Illustration. The Society of Illustrators, 1984.
 Peter H. Falk, Who Was Who in American Art, 1564-1975: 400 Years of Artists in America. Sound View Press, 1999.
 David Lasky, amateur Haneologist

External links
 Vanguard Productions site for Hane monograph Roger Hane: Art, Times & Tragedy (by Robert C. Hunsicker)
 Flickr group collection of Roger Hane illustrations

1939 births
1974 deaths
People murdered in New York City
Male murder victims
American illustrators
American speculative fiction artists
Fantasy artists
Artists from Pennsylvania
Science fiction artists
University of the Arts (Philadelphia) alumni